General Johnnie Edward Wilson (born February 4, 1944) is a retired United States Army four-star general who served as Commanding General, United States Army Materiel Command from 1996 to 1999. He also served as the 25th Chief of Ordnance for the United States Army Ordnance Corps.

Military career
Wilson was born on February 5, 1944, in Baton Rouge, Louisiana. He was raised in Lorain, Ohio, and entered the United States Army in August 1961 as an enlisted soldier, attaining the rank of staff sergeant before attending Officer Candidate School (OCS). Upon completion of OCS in 1967, he was commissioned a second lieutenant in the Ordnance Corps. He was awarded a Bachelor of Science degree in Business Administration from the University of Nebraska at Omaha. He also holds a Master of Science degree in Logistics Management from the Florida Institute of Technology. His military education includes completion of the Ordnance Officer Basic and Advanced Courses, the Army Command and General Staff College, and the Industrial College of the Armed Forces.

Wilson held a wide variety of command and staff positions, culminating in his assignment as the Commanding General, United States Army Materiel Command. Other key assignments include: Deputy Chief of Staff for Logistics, Department of the Army, Pentagon; Chief of Staff, United States Army Materiel Command; Commanding General, Ordnance Center and School, Aberdeen Proving Ground, Maryland; Deputy Commanding General, 21st Area Theater Command, United States Army Europe and 7th Army; Commander, 13th Support Command, Fort Hood, Texas; and Commander, Division Support Command, 1st Armored Division, United States Army Europe.

Wilson served at every level of command. He commanded three times at the company level; a maintenance company in the 82nd Airborne Division as a first lieutenant, followed by command of a supply and services company in South Vietnam with the 173rd Airborne Brigade, and B Company 123rd Maintenance Battalion with the 1st Armored Division in Europe. At the lieutenant colonel level, Wilson commanded the 709th Maintenance Battalion, 9th Infantry Division, Fort Lewis, which converted and became the army's first Main Support Battalion. Wilson commanded twice at the colonel level, serving as the DISCOM Commander of the 1st Armored Division followed by command of the 13th Support Command at Fort Hood, Texas.

Wilson next served as the Deputy Commanding General, 21st TAACOM, the army's largest and most diverse logistics unit. Based on his wide experience with leading soldiers, Wilson was selected to become the Chief of Ordnance of the United States Army and command the United States Army Ordnance Center and School responsible for the training and professional development of thousands of soldiers, NCOs, and officers every year. Following this successful assignment, Wilson served as the Chief of Staff, AMC, where he was responsible for resource and personnel management for a workforce with over 80,000 military and civilian members. From 1994 to 1996 served as the Deputy Chief of Staff for Logistics, Department of the Army, where he was responsible for worldwide logistics.

Decorations
Wilson's awards and decorations include the Army Distinguished Service Medal (with Oak Leaf Cluster), Legion of Merit (with Oak Leaf Cluster), Bronze Star Medal (with 2 Oak Leaf Clusters), Meritorious Service Medal (with 2 Oak Leaf Clusters), Army Commendation Medal, Good Conduct Medal, Special Forces Tab, Master Parachutist Badge and the Army Staff Identification Badge. Wilson retired from the United States Army on 26 April 1999.

Post military career
After retirement, Wilson became President and Chief Operating Officer of Dimensions International, Inc. He has also served on the board of the Truman Library Institute, after being nominated by Colin Powell, and serves on the Army Scholarship Foundation as a member of the Foundation's Honorary Advisory Committee.

Wilson is married to the former Helen McGhee of Elyria, Ohio. They have three children and seven grandchildren.

Wilson is a member of Alpha Phi Alpha fraternity. He is also a member of Sigma Pi Phi.

Wilson also served ten years on Morgan State Board of Regents, Washington First Bank Board of Directors. Other Honors: a school, a park, and a tower named in his honor in Lorain Ohio; honorary doctor of laws decree from Alabama A&M University, US Army Officer Candidate Distinguished Graduate , BEYA Lifetime Achievement.

In July 2022, he joined with other former U.S. military leaders in condemning former president and commander in chief, Donald Trump. "While rioters tried to thwart the peaceful transfer of power and ransacked the Capitol on Jan. 6, 2021, the president and commander in chief, Donald Trump, abdicated his duty to preserve, protect and defend the Constitution."

Notes

References
African-American Ascends from Private to Four-Star General
Redstone Aresenal bio

1944 births
Living people
United States Army generals
United States Army personnel of the Vietnam War
Florida Institute of Technology alumni
Recipients of the Distinguished Service Medal (US Army)
Recipients of the Legion of Merit
People from Lorain, Ohio
University of Nebraska Omaha alumni
African-American United States Army personnel
United States Army Command and General Staff College alumni
American chief operating officers
21st-century African-American people
African Americans in the Vietnam War